Finnegan Shannon is an American multidisciplinary artist located in Brooklyn, New York, United States. Working primarily on increasing perceptions of accessibility, Finnegan's practice focuses on disability culture in inaccessible spaces. Finnegan is most known for their protest pieces such as art gallery benches criticizing lack of seating and lounges for those who cannot access stairs.

Background and identity
Finnegan Shannon has been disabled their whole life, but grew up feeling isolated from the disability community. They experience pain when walking and standing, and thus focus on their need to consistently rest.

Finnegan graduated with a BA in Studio Art from Carleton College in 2011, and immediately began working at the Wassaic Project through 2014

Their work has been exhibited in major cultural institutions internationally, including the Banff Centre for Arts and Creativity, Friends of the High Line, the Tallinn Art Hall, Nook Gallery., and the Wassaic Project They have spoken about their work at the Brooklyn Museum, the School for Poetic Computation, The 8th Floor, and The Andrew Heiskell Braille and Talking Book Library.

In 2018, Finnegan received a Wynn Newhouse Award. and participated in Art Beyond Sight's Art + Disability Residency In 2019, Finnegan was an artist-in-residence at Eyebeam. Their work has been written about in C Magazine, Art in America, Hyperallergeic, and the New York Times.

Solo projects
 DUEL at the OUTLET Fine Art, Brooklyn, NY in 2013
 SHOULD / CAN’T, at The Invisible Dog, Brooklyn, NY in 2014
 The Worst at Carleton College, Northfield, MN in 2016
 fashionablecanes dot com on Tête-à-Tête, tete-ahh-tete.net in 2017
 Self-portrait at The Invisible Dog Art Center, Brooklyn, NY in 2017
 Anti-Stairs Club Lounge at the Wassaic Project, Wassaic, NY in 2017
 Disability History PSA, Eastern Pole, Cincinnati, OH in 2018
 Alt-Text as Poetry, developed at Eyebeam, presented at Queens Museum, Pratt, BAMPFA, and others in 2019
 Anti-Stairs Club Lounge, Vessel at Hudson Yards, New York, NY in 2019
 Lone Proponent of Wall-to-Wall Carpet, Carleton University Art Gallery, Ottawa, Canada in 2020

Group exhibitions
 She's Crafty (in collaboration with Breanne Trammell) at The New Museum Store, New York, NY in 2012
 Peaces on Earth, at Sardine, Brooklyn, NY in 2012
 Everything is Index at The Invisible Dog, Brooklyn, NY in 2012
 Homeward Found, at The Wassaic Project, Wassaic, NY in 2013
 INK + IMAGE, OUTLET Fine Art in collaboration with The Center For Fiction, at Brooklyn, NY in 2013
 Drawings Along Myrtle Ave, Organized by Pratt Institute, at Brooklyn, NY in 2014
 All That & A Bag of Chips, at Dead Space, Brooklyn, NY in 2014
 BOGO, Davidson Contemporary, at New York, NY in 2015
 Company, at A4 Contemporary Art Center, Chengdu, China in 2015
 The Descent of Dust at Radiator Arts, New York, NY in 2016
 Endless Biennial, at 20/20 Gallery, Elizabeth Foundation for the Arts, New York, NY in 2016
 Reflections on Failure, at Radiator Arts, Queens, NY in 2016
 Sociometry Fair 2016, at The Smell, Los Angeles, CA in 2016
 Wynn Newhouse Awards, at The Palitz Gallery, New York, NY in 2017
 Manifesto, at Nook Gallery, Oakland, CA in 2017
 Locus: Art as a Disabled Space, at The 8th Floor, New York, NY in 2018
 Means of Egress, at Dedalus Foundation, Brooklyn, NY in 2018
 Sign Project: Access and Accessibility Stories, at High Line, New York, NY in 2019
 Disarming Language, at Tallinn Art Hall, Tallinn, Estonia in 2019
 On Audio Description, in collaboration with Aislinn Thomas, at Banff Centre, Alberta, Canada in 2019
 Talk Back, at Flux Factory, Queens, NY in 2019
 Crip Imponderabilia, at NYU Galletin, New York, NY in 2019

Awards

 2012 and 2013 Selected artist, Short list curated by Kris Nuzzi, BRIC Artist Registry, Brooklyn, NY
 2014 Nominee, Rema Hort Mann Foundation Emerging Artist Grant, New York, NY
 2015 Grantee, Awesome Foundation, New York, NY

Residencies

 2012 Resident, The Wassaic Project, Wassaic, NY
 2015 Fellow, Copy Shop Residency, Endless Editions, New York, NY
 2018 Recipient, Wynn Newhouse Award, New York, NY
 2018 Resident, Ace Hotel Artist Residency, Curated by Taeyoon Choi, New York, NY
 2018 Resident, Art + Disability Residency, Art Beyond Sight, New York, N Y
 2018 Fellow, WITH x SYPartners, New York, NY
 2019 Resident, at Eyebeam, New York, NY in 2019

Further reading
 
 
 
 
 
 
 
 </ref>

References

Living people
Date of birth missing (living people)
Place of birth missing (living people)
Artists from Brooklyn
Carleton College alumni
Artists with disabilities
Year of birth missing (living people)